Gary Spetze's Painting Wild Places is a watercolor painting television series hosted by Gary Spetze which debuted in 2004. The series, similar in format to The Joy of Painting is distributed by American Public Television to select PBS-member stations.

External links

2004 American television series debuts
2010s American television series
American educational television series
PBS original programming